José Raúl Loncón (born June 4, 1988 in Comodoro Rivadavia, Argentina) is an Argentine footballer currently playing for Ñublense of the Chilean First Division B.

Teams
  Ferrocarril de Comodoro Rivadavia 2003
  C.A.I. 2004-2007
  Jorge Newbery (CR) 2007-2012
  Racing de Olavarría 2012-2013
  Curicó Unido 2013-2014
  C.A.I 2014-2015
  Atlético Colegiales 2015-2016
  Ñublense 2016–present

References
 
 

1988 births
Living people
Argentine footballers
Argentine expatriate footballers
Racing de Olavarría footballers
Comisión de Actividades Infantiles footballers
Curicó Unido footballers
Primera B de Chile players
Expatriate footballers in Chile
Association football midfielders
People from Comodoro Rivadavia